Zolotaya Gora is a rural locality (a selo) in Sosnovoborsky Selsoviet of Zeysky District, Amur Oblast, Russia. The population was 62 as of 2018. There are 4 streets.

Geography 
Zolotaya Gora is located 88 km north of Zeya (the district's administrative centre) by road. Kirovsky is the nearest rural locality.

References 

Rural localities in Zeysky District